Monachia (minor planet designation: 428 Monachia) is an asteroid orbiting within the Flora family in the Main Belt.

It was discovered by Walther Villiger on 18 November 1897 in Munich, Germany. It was his only asteroid discovery. The asteroid's name comes from the Latin name for Munich.

References

External links
 
 

Flora asteroids
Monachia
18971118
Monachia